Mustafa Levent Göktaş (born June 8, 1959) is a Turkish colonel, who took part in the 1999 operation to catch Abdullah Öcalan, the leader of the Kurdish terrorist organization PKK, designated as a terrorist organisation in Turkey. In January 2009, Göktaş was detained in the Ergenekon investigation. Göktaş was released on 10 March 2014, along with other Ergenekon defendants.

He is a member of the Special Forces Command; an elite special forces unit.

References 
https://www.state.gov/j/ct/rls/other/des/123085.htm

1959 births
People from Tokat
Turkish Military Academy alumni
Turkish Army officers
Living people
Inmates of Silivri Prison